Zhu Zhixin (朱执信) (12 October 1885 – 21 September 1920) was a colleague of Sun Yatsen in his early organizing of the anti-Manchu revolutionary party the Tong Meng Hui and helped Sun develop and spread his revolutionary philosophy. In 1905 he provided the first Chinese translation of Karl Marx and Friedrich Engels's The Communist Manifesto. In 1918 he decided to forgo further military affairs and follow cultural and ideological pursuits. Zhu was a gifted writer and polemicist known among other writers. After his untimely death in 1920, Wang Jingwei helped establish the Zhixin Memorial School in Guangzhou.

References 
 

Chinese revolutionaries
Republic of China politicians from Guangdong
1885 births
1920 deaths
People from Panyu District
Politicians from Guangzhou
Burials in Guangzhou